The 2023 Georgia Swarm season is the 7th season of the Georgia Swarm, a lacrosse team based in Duluth, Georgia playing in the National Lacrosse League. The team was formerly based in Saint Paul, Minnesota and was known as the Minnesota Swarm.

Regular season

Current standings

Game log

Roster

Entry Draft
The 2022 NLL Entry Draft took place on September 10, 2022. The Swarm made the following selections:

References

Georgia Swarm
Georgia Swarm
Georgia Swarm seasons